"Tears from the Moon" is a music single by Canadian electronic music project Conjure One featuring vocals from Irish singer-songwriter Sinéad O'Connor. The song hit #1 at World Dance/Trance Top 20 Singles and World Soundtracks/OST Top 20 Singles. 

It was originally written by Kyoko Peggy Baertsoen, Rick Nowels and Billy Steinberg. Baertsoen was a member of the Belgian group Lunascape and the song was originally featured on their release Reflecting Seyelence.

Along with being featured in the "Charmed: The Final Chapter" soundtrack to the show Charmed, one of its remixes was featured in the Lara Croft Tomb Raider: The Cradle of Life soundtrack.

On 17 August 2022, the anamé remix was released.

Notable remixes
Tiësto In Search of Sunrise Remix (8:13)
Robbie Rivera Mix (8:44)
Carmen Rizzo Stateside West Chill Out Mix (6:09)
Hybrid Twisted On The Terrace Mix (9:51)
Hybrid Twisted On The Terrace Mix V.2 (7:40)
Billy Gillies Extended Remix (5:42)
anamé Remix (4:51)
anamé Extended Mix (8:44)

References

External links
Music video
Releases
Statistics at Top40-charts.com

2002 singles
2002 songs
Conjure One songs
Nettwerk Records singles
Progressive house songs
Songs written by Billy Steinberg
Songs written by Rick Nowels
Trance songs